The Wellhorn is a mountain of the Bernese Alps, overlooking Rosenlaui in the Bernese Oberland. On its eastern side is the Rosenlaui Glacier.

References

External links
 Wellhorn on Hikr

Bernese Alps
Mountains of the Alps
Alpine three-thousanders
Mountains of Switzerland
Oberhasli
Mountains of the canton of Bern